Petrovka is a rural locality (a village) in Maximovksky Selsoviet, Sterlitamaksky District, Bashkortostan, Russia. The population was 61 as of 2010. There is one street.

Geography 
Petrovka is located 46 km west of Sterlitamak (the district's administrative centre) by road. Maximovka is the nearest rural locality.

References 

Rural localities in Sterlitamaksky District